Up Your Ass may refer to:

 Up Your Ass (play), a 1965 play by Valerie Solanas
 The English translation of Tilhas Tizig Gesheften, a group of Jewish Brigade members